Alan K. Rode is an American film scholar and preservationist, cinema host and producer. He is best known for his books, Michael Curtiz: A Life in Film and Charles McGraw: Biography of a Film Noir Tough Guy.

Life and career

Rode was born in Orange, New Jersey. His mother was born and raised in Hollywood, where she was an extra in Our Gang comedy shorts and studied at Ben Bard Drama. His maternal grandfather was a violinist and composer who ascended from playing mood music on silent film sets and movie bit parts to Universal Studios house composer and eventually founded Corelli-Jacobs Recording Inc.  A great-uncle doubled Gary Cooper and fought Jack Dempsey. Another grandfather promoted rodeos with cowboy star Hoot Gibson at Los Angeles Gilmore Stadium. After graduation from Summit High School, he enlisted in the United States Navy. He transitioned to his next career in the aerospace and services industries while earning advanced degrees in education and management. He began writing about film in 2000.

Rode is a charter director and treasurer of the Film Noir Foundation and co-hosts the NOIR CITY, Hollywood and Chicago film festivals. He has been the producer and host of the annual Arthur Lyons Film Noir Festival in Palm Springs, California since 2008 and has hosted numerous other cinema events. In addition to his many filmed interviews of Hollywood artists, he has produced numerous classic film Blu-ray commentaries and special features and appeared as a Spotlight co-host on Turner Classic Movies (TCM) in 2018.

Filmography
As producer/writer
 2017 - Into the Darkness: Mann, Alton and T-Men
 2017 - A Director's Daughter: Nina Mann
 2017 - Below the Surface: He Walked by Night
 2018 - Dennis O'Keefe: An Extraordinary Ordinary Guy
 2018 - Deadly is the Male: The Making of RAW DEAL
 2018 - The Man Who Cheated Himself-Revisited
 2019 - A Sedulous Cinderella: Richard Fleischer Remembered
 2019 - Freeing Trapped
 2020 - Remembering Fay Wray
 2020 - ‘’Martini Shot: William Atherton and The Day of the Locust”
 2020 - ‘’Hollywood Champion: A Tribute to Kirk Douglas
 2021 - “Facemaker: Peter Lorre and The Face Behind the Mask”
 2021 - "Zanuck Goes to War: The World War II Films of Fox"
 2021 - "Eagle Lion: A Noir-Stained Legacy"
 2022 - "John Reinhardt: Direction Without Borders"
 2022 - "Jack Wrather: A Legacy of Film and Friendship"  
As actor

 2008 - Peril at Sea: Charting a Dangerous Crossing Featurette, Himself
 2008 - Gene Tierney: Final Curtain for a Noir Icon, Himself
 2008 - Henry Hathaway: When the Going Gets Tough, Himself
 2008 - Turning of the Tide: The Ill-Starred Making of Moontide, Himself
 2008 - The Western Grows Up, Himself
 2008 - Killer Instincts: Richard Widmark and Ida Lupino at Twentieth Century Fox, Himself
 2008 - From Journeyman to Artist: Otto Preminger and the Making of Daisy Kenyon, Himself
 2008 - Arthur Miller: Painter with Light Himself
 2011 - The Cost of Living: Creating the Prowler, Himself
 2012 - Michael Curtiz: The Greatest Director You Never Heard Of, Himself
 2012 - Casablanca: An Unlikely Classic, Himself
 2013 - Six Geniuses from Budapest, Himself
 2013 - Eternal History: The Making of From Here to Eternity, Himself
 2014 - The True Adventures of Raoul Walsh, Himself
 2016 - Tiger Hunt: Restoring Too Late for Tears, Himself

 2016 - Love Is a Roller Coaster: Woman on the Run Revisited, Himself
 2016 - Chance of a Lifetime: The Making of Too Late for Tears, Himself
 2016 - A Wild Ride: Restoring Woman on the Run, Himself
 2017 - Master of Noir: The Cinematography of John Alton, Himself
 2017 - A New Dimension in Noir: Filming Inferno in 3D, Himself
 2017 - Helming a Masterpiece: Alan K. Rode on the Breaking Point, Himself
 2017 - Into the Darkness: Mann, Alton and T-Men, Himself
 2017 - Below the Surface: He Walked by Night, Himself
 2018 - Dennis O'Keefe: An Extraordinary Ordinary Guy, Himself
 2018 - Deadly is the Male: The Making of RAW DEAL, Himself
 2018 - Jean Pierre Melville: A Primer, Himself
 2018 - The Man Who Cheated Himself-Revisited, Himself
 2019 - American Frontiers: Anthony Mann at Universal, Himself
 2019 - Freeing Trapped, Himself
 2020 - ‘’Hollywood Champion A Tribute to Kirk Douglas", Himself
 2021 - ‘’Facemaker: Peter Lorre and The Face Behind the Mask", Himself
 2021 - Zanuck Goes to War: The World War II Films of Fox", Narrator
 2021 - Eagle-Lion: A Noir-Stained Legacy", Himself
 2022 - John Reinhardt: Direction Without Borders", Himself
 2022 - Jack Wrather: A Legacy of Film and Friendship", Himself
 2022 - Nightmare: The Life and Films of Cornell Woolrich", Himself

Publications
 Michael Curtiz: A Life in Film 
 Charles McGraw: Biography of a Film Noir Tough Guy''

References

External links
 
 

Living people
American male writers
American film producers
American film historians
Year of birth missing (living people)